Kara Vallow is an American television animation producer who works with Seth MacFarlane on the four television series produced by Fuzzy Door Productions for Fox, Family Guy, American Dad! (now moved to TBS), The Cleveland Show, and Cosmos: A Spacetime Odyssey.

Career
Vallow worked at the New York City-based studio Broadcast Arts, best known for set design for Pee-wee's Playhouse. She eventually moved to Los Angeles to work at Hyperion Pictures as the supervisor of the production layout department on the feature Bébé's Kids, a multi-cultural animated feature film.

Over the next few years, Vallow found herself at Murakami-Wolf as producer of Teenage Mutant Ninja Turtles TV series during its waning years. She worked at Hanna-Barbera, where she produced the series Johnny Bravo, and where she met Seth MacFarlane.

Vallow then went on to Sony to produce their first primetime series, Dilbert, with Larry Charles, which ran on UPN for two seasons. She then took over as producer for season three of Family Guy before its brief cancellation. In 2004, Vallow created and produced the animation sequences in the critically acclaimed and award-winning documentary In the Realms of the Unreal directed by Jessica Yu. She produced the MTV series 3 South, the pilot for Comedy Central’s Drawn Together and the presentations for Fox's American Dad! and an untitled Phil Hendrie pilot, before Fox made the decision to bring back Family Guy for an unprecedented 35 episode order. In order to accommodate producing both Family Guy and American Dad! simultaneously, she built a standalone animation studio for 20th Television and assembled a 200+ person team. She also produced the Fox presentations Two Dreadful Children and Bordertown. Nominated for five Emmys, Vallow was at one time responsible for three half-hours of programming on Sunday nights: Family Guy, American Dad!, and The Cleveland Show.

Vallow runs two blogs, Teen Sleuth and the book blog, The Haunted Library.

References

External links

 
 

Television producers from Pennsylvania
American women television producers
1967 births
Living people
Television personalities from Philadelphia
21st-century American women